Rudolph Hamilton Mobley (December 8, 1921 – September 7, 2003), also known as "Little Doc", was an American football halfback.  He played college football at Hardin–Simmons University. He twice led the NCAA major colleges in rushing yardage with 1,281 rushing yards in 1942 and 1,262 yards in 1946. His football career was interrupted by military service during World War II; Mobley served from May 1943 to February 1946.  With Mobley as the leading ground-gainer and Warren B. Woodson as head coach, Hardin-Simmons compiled a perfect 11–0 record in 1946. Mobley was drafted by the Philadelphia Eagles of the National Football League (NFL) in the 11th round of the 1945 NFL draft, and played one season for the Baltimore Colts in 1947.

See also
 List of college football yearly rushing leaders

References

1921 births
2003 deaths
American football halfbacks
Baltimore Colts players
Hardin–Simmons Cowboys football players
People from Paducah, Texas
Players of American football from Texas
American military personnel of World War II
Baltimore Colts (1947–1950) players